The K League 2 (Hangul: K리그2) is the men's second-highest division of the South Korean football league system. It is contested between thirteen professional clubs and operates on a promotion and relegation system with K League 1 and K3 League.

History 

In 2011, the original K League announced a plan to begin a promotion and relegation system between the K League and a proposed second division. The K League then took steps to create the new second division, mainly with the addition of a split-system during the 2012 K-League season in which the bottom clubs are placed in a competition for safety with the last placed club being relegated to the new second division (originally it was going to be two clubs relegated but the withdrawal of Sangju Sangmu meant only one would be relegated).

The second division was going to get the name of K League, and the original K League's name was changed to "K League Classic" along with the new logo. However, the change caused some degree of confusion and controversy, and on 11 March 2013 the official name was changed to "K League Challenge". On 22 January 2018, its name was once again changed to "K League 2".

In the 2013 season, the 13th and 14th placed teams in the K League Classic were automatically relegated, while the 12th placed team played a match against the winner of the newly-formed K League Challenge to decide promotion/relegation. From the 2014 season, only the 12th team of the top division is automatically relegated, with the 11th team playing a two-leg match against the winner of the K League 2 promotion playoffs to decide promotion/relegation. The promotion playoffs are as follows: the fourth-placed team plays against the third-placed team, then the winner of this match plays with the second-placed team. If the match is tied, the higher-placed team advances.

In 2023, promotion and relegation between K League 2 and the third tier K3 League was introduced.

Current clubs

Champions

By season

By club

See also
K League
K League 1
South Korean football league system
K League Awards
List of foreign K League 2 players

References

External links 
 Official K League website

 
2013 establishments in South Korea
2
Sports leagues established in 2013
Summer association football leagues
Second level football leagues in Asia
Professional sports leagues in South Korea